Nicole Génier (born October 23, 1955) is a Canadian former handball player who competed in the 1976 Summer Olympics.

Born in Saint-Jean-sur-Richelieu, Quebec, Génier was part of the Canadian handball team, which finished sixth in the Olympic tournament. She played four matches.

References

1955 births
Canadian female handball players
Handball players at the 1976 Summer Olympics
Living people
Olympic handball players of Canada
People from Saint-Jean-sur-Richelieu
Sportspeople from Quebec
French Quebecers